OneUnited Bank is an African-American-owned and managed Massachusetts-chartered trust company headquartered in Boston, Massachusetts. It is also registered by the Federal Deposit Insurance Corporation (FDIC), and certified as a community development financial institution (CDFI) by the United States Department of Treasury. As of April 30, 2018, OneUnited Bank maintained $661.2 million in total assets.

History

Beginnings
The bank was founded in 1968 as Unity Bank & Trust Company with $1.2 million in capital in the then-Dudley Square (now Nubian Square) neighborhood of Boston, aiming to revitalize the area by lending exclusively to local businesses and homeowners. Unity Bank failed after nine years of operations, and a newly organized bank, Bank of Boston Commerce, was formed.

Boston Bank of Commerce expanded the model of community development to include partnerships with large corporations and government agencies. Its chairmen included United States Senator Edward Brooke. With total assets of  $257,183,000 and total deposits of $125,216,000 as of 31 December 2000, Boston Bank of Commerce filed for application to merge with Founders National Bank of Los Angeles, California, its four offices in operation and total resources of $107,009,000 and total deposits of $98,659,000 as of December 31, 2000. "Favorable" statutory factors, other relevant information and Comptroller of Currency reports led to the approval of the merger transaction application from Boston Bank of Commerce, by the Board of Governors of the Federal Reserve System, the Director of the Office of Thrift Supervision, and the Attorney General of the United States.

1990s
In the mid-1990s, following the economic downturn that adversely affected other northeast-based regional banks, Boston Bank of Commerce was placed under a cease-and-desist order by the FDIC and charged to increase capital and improve the quality of its loan portfolio. In 1995 a significant capital infusion was made under the current Chairman and CEO Kevin Cohee and President and COO Teri Williams, along with a new strategy of acquiring African American-owned banks and thrift institutions in major metropolitan markets. When the bank's current senior management team assumed control of Boston Bank of Commerce, the institution temporarily had negative equity and significant asset problems. Its management subsequently acquired three African-American owned banks over several years that were troubled or on the verge of failure. Boston Bank of Commerce became the first interstate African American-owned bank in the country through its acquisition of Peoples National Bank of Commerce, South Florida’s only African-American-owned bank.

2000s
In 2001 the institution merged with Founders National Bank of Los Angeles, of which the majority owners were former professional basketball player and businessman Earvin "Magic" Johnson, musician Janet Jackson, and former Motown Records President Jheryl Busby.

Boston Bank of Commerce rebranded as OneUnited Bank.

OneUnited Bank offers an annual financial literacy essay contest for youth, and President Teri Williams wrote a children’s book, I Got Bank! What My Granddad Taught Me About Money, to teach financial literacy to urban youth.

In the latter part of 2008 and the beginning of 2009, OneUnited experienced financial problems as their equity investment in Freddie Mac and Fannie Mae became worthless. In order to stabilize the institution, the Bank applied for and received $12 million from the Troubled Asset Relief Program (TARP). Since 2009, the bank has demonstrated sustained profitability.

2010s
OneUnited Bank's branch staff use customer relationship management (CRM) software from Salesforce.com on iPads, in its Boston, Los Angeles and Miami branches.

In 2013, regulators from the Massachusetts Division of Banks and the FDIC said there has been “minimal lending activity” in Boston. They also cited a lack of lending in the Miami market that amounted to "substantial noncompliance". OneUnited had made or purchased 34 loans in Massachusetts in three years, according to the report. Of those, 26 took place in Suffolk County, where the bank operates three offices. The bank expanded lending and refinancing, mostly for multi-family properties in Los Angeles, issuing 78 loans. But it made just eight loans in Boston and three in Miami. Nationally, only nine of the bank's loans last year were made to low- or moderate-income borrowers.

In January 2014, OneUnited introduced the UNITY Visa secured credit card called the "Comeback Card", for customers with low credit scores. The card includes training for customers to improve their credit score. OneUnited Bank received recognition as a Notable IT Initiative from Community Banks by American Banker for the UNITY Visa Card's "Me" app, which allows consumers to apply for the card and, if they are approved, it allows them to open a deposit account to fund it.

Beginning November 1, 2014, OneUnited removed online and over-the-phone credit card balance pay services. Bank branches that currently provide these services over-the-counter are now only located in the metropolitan areas of Boston, Miami, and Los Angeles. Sending a check by mail is the current de facto payment method for Unity Credit Card holders who live at long distances from bank branches.

2020s

OneUnited came to media attention in 2020 after offering a Visa card featuring an image of abolitionist, slave rescuer and political activist Harriet Tubman apparently performing a "Wakanda Forever" salute (from the film Black Panther). The image was created by Miami, Florida artist Addonis Parker; he claimed that the gesture was intended to be the American Sign Language sign for "love."

Awards
In 2004, 2005, 2006, 2007 and 2008, OneUnited Bank won the Treasury Department's highest award – The Bank Enterprise Award.

See also
 Carver Bancorp
 Freedman's Savings Bank
 Credit One Bank

References

External links
 

Banks based in Massachusetts
Companies based in Boston
Banks established in 1968
1968 establishments in Massachusetts
Community development financial institutions
Black-owned companies of the United States